Qusin is a Palestinian town in the Nablus Governorate in northern West Bank, located 8 kilometers West of Nablus. According to the Palestinian Central Bureau of Statistics (PCBS), the town had a population of 1,734 inhabitants in mid-year 2006.

Location
Qusin is  located 7.7 km west of Nablus. It is bordered by Beit Iba to the east, Deir Sharaf to the north, Kafr Qaddum to the west, and Kafr Qaddum and Jit to the south.

History
Ceramics from the Byzantine era have been found here.

Yaqut (1179–1229) described Kusin as a "Village in the Filastin Province, so I believe."

Ottoman era
Qusin, like the rest of Palestine, was incorporated into the Ottoman Empire in 1517, and in the  census of 1596 it was a part of the nahiya ("subdistrict") of  Jabal Sami which was under the administration of the liwa ("district") of  Nablus.  The village had a population of 15 households and 7 bachelors, all Muslim. The villagers  paid a fixed tax-rate of 33,3% on agricultural products, such as  wheat, barley, summer crops,  beehives and/or goats, in addition to occasional revenues and  a customary tax for people of Nablus area; a total of 6,300  akçe.

In 1882, in the PEF's  Survey of Western Palestine,  Kusein was described as: "A village on the side of a ridge, apparently supplied by the water of the valley on the north, which has a flowing stream. A spring exists about three-quarters of a mile south-east in the valley." They further noted that: "The ruin shown near this place is merely a heap of stones."

British Mandate era

In the  1922 census of Palestine conducted by the British Mandate authorities,  Qusen had a  population of 147 Muslims, increasing  in  the 1931 census to  217 Muslims, in 48 houses.

In the  1945 statistics, Qusin had a  population of 310 Muslims  while the total land area was 4,543 dunams, according to an official land and population survey. 
Of this, 59 dunams were used for plantations and irrigable land, 3,227 for cereals, while 21 dunams were classified as built-up areas.

Jordanian era
In the wake of the 1948 Arab–Israeli War, and after the 1949 Armistice Agreements, Qusin came under Jordanian rule.

The Jordanian census of 1961 found 494 inhabitants.

Post 1967
After the Six-Day War in 1967, Qusin came under Israeli occupation. 

After  the 1995 accords 51% of village land is defined as Area B land, while the remaining 49% is defined as Area C. Israel has confiscated about 500 dunham of village land for future expansion of Israeli settlements, and additional land for Israeli bypass roads.

References

Bibliography

External links
  Welcome  to Qusin
Survey of Western Palestine, Map 11:    IAA, Wikimedia commons  
 Qusin Village Profile,   Applied Research Institute–Jerusalem (ARIJ) 
 Qusin, aerial photo, ARIJ
 Development Priorities and Needs in Qusin, ARIJ 

Nablus Governorate
Villages in the West Bank
Municipalities of the State of Palestine